The Calgary Sports and Entertainment Corporation (CSEC) is a privately owned professional sports and entertainment company based in Calgary, Alberta, Canada formed in 2012 and owned by N. Murray Edwards, Alvin Libin, Allan Markin, Jeffrey McCaig, Clay Riddell, and Byron Seaman.

It succeeded the Calgary Flames Limited Partnership (CFLP), which represented the group that has owned the Calgary Flames of the National Hockey League (NHL) since 1980. CFLP subsequently acquired ownership of the Calgary Hitmen of the Western Hockey League (WHL), the Calgary Roughnecks of the National Lacrosse League (NLL), the Calgary Stampeders of the Canadian Football League (CFL), and the Calgary Wranglers of the American Hockey League (AHL).  The group also manages the Scotiabank Saddledome arena in Calgary. It formerly owned the Adirondack Thunder of the ECHL until selling it to a local ownership group.  CSEC is privately owned by the six owners that formed the CFLP, minus Clay Riddell, who died in 2018, and is chaired by N. Murray Edwards.  Ken King was the chief executive officer until his death in 2020.

Assets
Calgary Sports and Entertainment owns and operates five franchises based in Calgary including the Flames' minor league affiliate, the Calgary Wranglers.  Additionally, CSEC has a management agreement with the City of Calgary to operate the Scotiabank Saddledome arena which serves as the home venue of the Flames, Hitmen and Roughnecks. In August 2015, the CSEC proposed a new multi-purpose sports venue in Calgary.

References

 
2012 establishments in Alberta
Calgary Flames owners
Companies based in Calgary
Canadian companies established in 2012
Calgary Stampeders
Sports management companies